VIP Brother is a Bulgarian reality television game show in which a number of celebrity contestants live in an isolated house trying to avoid being evicted by the public with the aim of winning a large cash prize or collecting money for charity. The first three seasons of the show to date have aired in the spring (started in March) in 2006, 2007 and 2009, and last six seasons (commencing on September) in the autumn.

The show is a spin-off of the original series Big Brother. There are a number of differences between Big Brother and VIP Brother. For example, VIP Brother lasts for a shorter time than Big Brother - seasons 1 and 2 lasted for 4 and 5 weeks, respectively. Due to the show's popularity seasons 3-9 all lasted for two months. Regular editions usually last for three months (12–13 weeks). The celebrities are paid for their participation.

From its inception in 2006, VIP Brother has been broadcast on Nova Television. The show is presented by Niki Kanchev. Evelina Pavlova was a co-host during the first season, and Aleksandra Sarchadjieva in six seasons.

History
VIP Brother first aired in March 2006 after the huge success of Big Brother 1 and Big Brother 2. The celebrity edition turned out to be even more successful and the second season in 2007 was extended to 33 Days. Due to rebuilding the House the Big Brother format in Bulgaria was on hiatus until September 2008 when Big Brother 4 aired, followed by VIP Brother 3 in March 2009. The third celebrity edition introduced a unique conception in which celebrities performed for charity every week and they were even allowed to leave the House collecting money for their causes. This was the first season to air for two months. After the moderate success of Big Brother Family (also known as Big Brother 5) in 2010 the format went on another hiatus for two years. In 2012 it was announced that Nova TV had closed a deal with Endemol for two seasons of the Big Brother format in Bulgaria. In September VIP Brother 4 aired lasted for 63 Days (the longest celebrity season so far) and immediately followed by an all-stars edition. As VIP Brother proved to be a rating success, the show was renewed for another season in 2013 with VIP Brother 5 commenced on 15 September. In 2014 it was announced for communist rule (1944-1989) in VIP Brother 6. In 2015 VIP Brother 7 (also known as VIP Brother - 100% напудрен) was commenced on 13 September. In 2016 VIP Brother 8 (also known as VIP Brother: Играта загрубява) was commenced on 11 September and marked 10 years of the premiere of VIP Brother.

Format
Like the original Big Brother, VIP Brother is a game show in which a group of celebrities, called the Housemates, live in isolation from the outside world in a house, which includes everyday facilities such as a fully equipped kitchen, garden, bedrooms, bathrooms and living area. The House is also a television studio with cameras and microphones in all rooms to record the activities of the Housemates. The only place where housemates can escape the company of the other contestants is the Diary Room, where they are encouraged to voice their true feelings. Each week (twice a week in VIP Brother 1 and 2), all Housemates nominate two of their fellow contestants for potential eviction (in season one and two they had to give two negative points to one Housemate and one negative point to another). The two, or more, Housemates with the highest number of nominations face a public vote conducted by phone (text messages). In VIP Brother 3 voting was positive and only a few Housemates were eligible to nominate, pointing all contestants who would not face the public vote. Occasionally, more than one housemate may be evicted in a week.

Season details

Bulgarian television series
2006 Bulgarian television series debuts
2018 Bulgarian television series endings
2000s Bulgarian television series
2010s Bulgarian television series
Bulgaria
Big Brother (Bulgarian TV series)
Bulgarian reality television series
Nova (Bulgarian TV channel) original programming